The Wake Forest University Demon Deacons women's soccer team is an amateur, NCAA Division I college soccer team composed of students attending Wake Forest University in Winston-Salem, North Carolina.  They achieved their best NCAA Tournament result in 2011, when they reached the College Cup.  Like all sports teams from Wake Forest, women's soccer competes in the Atlantic Coast Conference.  The Deacons play their home matches at Spry Stadium on the campus of Wake Forest.

History

1990s
Wake Forest fielded its first team in 1994, under the coaching of Chris Turner.  The Deacons went 8–9–0 in their first season.  However, all of those 8 wins came outside the Atlantic Coast Conference.  Despite the team's 0–6 conference record, they still qualified for the ACC Women's Soccer Tournament, where they would lose in the first round.  In 1995, the team won their first ACC game, and finished with a .500 record of 9–9–3.  Continuing to build, they won 2 conference games and their first ACC tournament game in 1996.  Their 14–8 overall record would be the program's first winning record.  The team qualified for its first NCAA Tournament.  This would start a run of 18 straight NCAA qualifications for the Demon Deacons.  The team couldn't quite reach the same heights in 1997, finishing 11–8–2 and losing in the first round of the NCAA Tournament.  After the season Chris Turner would leave as head coach and would be replaced by Tony da Luz.  In his first season, Da Luz would lead the Demon Deacons to their first ever winning conference season.  The team also qualified for the NCAA Tournament and finished the season nationally ranked.  In 1999, a trip to the third round of the NCAA Tournament earned the team its first top 15 ranking at the end of the season.  The Demon Deacons closed the season with a 16–6–1 record.  A program record for wins in a season that stood until 2011.  The team also finished as runners up in the ACC Tournament.

2000s
The decade began with the Demon Deacon's third straight 4–3 ACC record.  However, this year it was good enough to finish for a tie for second place in the standings.  However, early exits in both the ACC and NCAA tournament saw the team finish with a final ranking of 23rd nationally.  This was the third straight year the team finished nationally ranked.  In 2001, the team ended a string of five straight winning seasons when they finished the season 9–9–2 overall.  They returned to their winning ways in 2002, but regressed in the ACC, finishing 2–4–1 and tied for seventh place in the standings.  The regression continued in 2003 when the team only won 1 game in the ACC.  However, the team continued to qualify for the NCAA tournament in these years.  2004 was a bit of a rebound year, as the team finished 4–4–1 in the ACC and 10–7 overall, for the second consecutive year.  In 2006, the Demon Deacons had their first ACC winning season since 2001, finishing 6–4–0 and tied a program record with 16 overall wins.  The team finished 19th in the final national rankings, their first end of season ranking since 2000.  The Demon Deacons achieved another final national ranking in 2007 after finishing 6–2–2 in the ACC and reaching the second round of the NCAA Tournament.  Their ranking run would continue in 2008 when the team finished 25th overall.  2009 would provide a breakthrough in the NCAA tournament, the Demon Deacons made the Quarterfinals.  This would be good enough to reach eighth in the final rankings, a program best at the time.

2010s
The decade would start off with a program first in 2010.  This year was the first time that Wake Forest won the ACC Tournament.  They managed to win the tournament despite finishing fifth in the conference regular season.  A second round appearance in the NCAA tournament was good enough to extend the streak of being ranked in the final rankings.  2011 was the best season in team history.  The team was runner up in the ACC Tournament and finished with a program best 18 overall wins.  The Demon Deacons also had their best NCAA Tournament finish in history.  They qualified for the college cup as a number 1 seed in the tournament and finished the season ranked fourth, a program best.  2012 couldn't quite see the same success.  However, the team did improve on its conference record.  2013 ended seven-year run of being ranked in the final rankings, as a 12–7–2 record and NCAA Sweet 16 appearance was not good enough to crack the final top 25.  2014 was the Demon Deacons first overall losing record since 1994, the year the program began.  They would also miss out on the NCAA tournament for the first time since 1996.  Things would get worse in 2015 when the team lost 12 games overall and finished tied for last in the ACC.  In 2016, the team mustered an overall winning record, but could not improve on a 2–8 conference record.  The team returned to the ACC tournament in 2017 for the first time in 4 seasons and ended a three-year skid of not qualifying for the NCAA tournament.  2018 finished positively when the team qualified for the Sweet 16 of the NCAA Tournament and finished the season ranked 25th overall.

2020s
The decade started with a season shortened by the COVID-19 pandemic.  The Demon Deacons would only play one non-conference game, against Duke.  The season was reduced to eight total conference games.  The team finished ninth overall, one spot out of qualifying for the ACC Tournament.  2021 saw a return to a more normal schedule and the Demon Deacons posted a 16–6–0 record going 6–4–0 in ACC play.  They won a tiebreaker to qualify for the ACC Tournament and received an at-large invite to the NCAA Tournament.  Their 16 wins was their highest win total since 2011.  2022 saw a repeat trip to the NCAA Tournament after a 9–6–3 regular season finish.  The Demon Deacons lost in the First Round for the first time since 2005.

Personnel

Roster

Team management

Source:

Seasons

Awards
ACC Coach of the Year:

 Tony da Luz - 1998

ACC Offensive Player of the Year:

 Katie Stengel - 2011

ACC Freshman of the Year:

 Emily Taggart - 1998
 Joline Charlton - 1999
 Katie Stengel - 2010

NSCAA All-Americans

 (*) Denotes 2nd Team All-American
 (**) Denotes 3rd Team All-American

All-ACC Players
 The players are all first team All-ACC, unless otherwise noted

 (*) Denotes 2nd Team All-ACC
 (**) Denotes 3rd Team All-ACC
 (^) Denotes All-Freshman ACC Team

Players in the WPS Draft

Players in the NWSL Draft

Notable alumni

Current Professional Players
  Katie Stengel (2010–2013) – Currently with Liverpool
  Ally Haran (2014–2017) – Currently with Canberra United
  Bayley Feist (2015–2018) – Currently with Washington Spirit
  Peyton Perea (2015–2018) – Currently with Glasgow City
  Madison Hammond (2016–2019) – Currently with Angel City
  Hannah Betfort (2017–2020) – Currently with Portland Thorns
  Ryanne Brown (2017–2021) – Currently with OL Reign
  Mariah Lee (2018) – Currently with Sporting de Huelva

References

External links
 
 The Atlantic Coast Conference website

 
NCAA Division I women's soccer teams
Soccer clubs in North Carolina